The Palazzo Bernardo Nani Lucheschi is a Renaissance-style palace between the Palazzo Giustinian Bernardo and larger and more grandiose Ca' Rezzonico, on the Grand Canal in the sestiere of Dorsoduro in the city of Venice, Italy.

History
The building was built in the mid-16th century at the site of an earlier palace, commissioned by the patrician Bernardo family from Alessandro Vittoria. Originally main facade of the palace was oriented towards the site where the Ca' Rezzonico now stands, formerly a garden. That facade was once heavily frescoed. The canal facade was added in the 17th century. The palace is privately owned and rented for events or as apartments. In 2016, InterContinental Hotels Group announced they would be converting the palazzo into the InterContinental Venice - Palazzo Nani Hotel set to open in 2018.

See also
Palazzo Nani

References

Bernardo Nani
Bernardo Nani
Renaissance architecture in Venice